In geometry, the great retrosnub icosidodecahedron or great inverted retrosnub icosidodecahedron is a nonconvex uniform polyhedron, indexed as . It has 92 faces (80 triangles and 12 pentagrams), 150 edges, and 60 vertices. It is given a Schläfli symbol

Cartesian coordinates 
Cartesian coordinates for the vertices of a great retrosnub icosidodecahedron are all the even permutations of
 (±2α, ±2, ±2β),
 (±(α−βτ−1/τ), ±(α/τ+β−τ), ±(−ατ−β/τ−1)),
 (±(ατ−β/τ+1), ±(−α−βτ+1/τ), ±(−α/τ+β+τ)),
 (±(ατ−β/τ−1), ±(α+βτ+1/τ), ±(−α/τ+β−τ)) and
 (±(α−βτ+1/τ), ±(−α/τ−β−τ), ±(−ατ−β/τ+1)),
with an even number of plus signs, where
 α = ξ−1/ξ
and
 β = −ξ/τ+1/τ2−1/(ξτ),
where τ = (1+)/2 is the golden mean and
ξ is the smaller positive real root of ξ3−2ξ=−1/τ, namely

 

Taking the odd permutations of the above coordinates with an odd number of plus signs gives another form, the enantiomorph of the other one. Taking the odd permutations with an even number of plus signs or vice versa results in the same two figures rotated by 90 degrees.

The circumradius for unit edge length is

The four positive real roots of the sextic in 

are the circumradii of the snub dodecahedron (U29), great snub icosidodecahedron (U57), great inverted snub icosidodecahedron (U69), and great retrosnub icosidodecahedron (U74).

See also 
 List of uniform polyhedra
 Great snub icosidodecahedron
 Great inverted snub icosidodecahedron

References

External links 
 

Uniform polyhedra